HMS Ledsham was one of 93 ships of the  of inshore minesweepers.

Their names were all chosen from villages ending in -ham. The minesweeper was named after Ledsham, Cheshire or Ledsham, West Yorkshire.

HMS Ledsham is now moored in Deptford Creek, London where it is the centre of the Minesweeper Collective, an artist's cooperative. The minesweeper houses a printing studio, and is a venue for art and music events. After many years moored in Deptford Creek on the night of 5 January 2017 an explosion near the former minesweeper led to the ship catching fire whilst the London Fire Brigade deployed a dozen fire engines to the scene of the fire.

References

Blackman, R.V.B. ed. Jane's Fighting Ships (1953)

 

Ham-class minesweepers
Royal Navy ship names
1954 ships
Ships built in England
Ships and vessels on the National Register of Historic Vessels